The 1983 Wightman Cup was the 55th edition of the annual women's team tennis competition between the United States and Great Britain. It was held at The College of William & Mary in Williamsburg, Virginia in the United States. It was held from November 1 through November 6, 1983.

References

1983
1983 in tennis
1983 in women's tennis
1983 in American tennis
1983 in British sport 
1983 in sports in Virginia